Dijan Vukojević (born 12 September 1995) is a Swedish footballer who plays for Degerfors IF as an attacking midfielder or a winger.

Club career
A prolific player on Sweden's second and third tier, Vukojević earned a transfer to the Slovak top flight. He made his professional Fortuna Liga debut for Spartak Trnava against ŠK Slovan Bratislava on 16 February 2020. Already in the summer of 2020 he returned to Sweden.

On 23 January 2022, Vukojević signed a three-year contract with Degerfors IF.

References

External links
 FC Spartak Trnava official club profile 
 Futbalnet profile 
 
 

1995 births
Living people
Swedish footballers
Association football midfielders
Jönköpings Södra IF players
Arameisk-Syrianska IF players
Husqvarna FF players
Norrby IF players
Degerfors IF players
Ettan Fotboll players
Superettan players
Allsvenskan players
FC Spartak Trnava players
Slovak Super Liga players
Swedish expatriate footballers
Expatriate footballers in Slovakia
Swedish expatriate sportspeople in Slovakia
Sportspeople from Jönköping